Gian Carlo Vacchelli Corbetto (16 December 1981 – 12 August 2020) was a Peruvian sports commentator and Fujimorist politician. Between 2011 and 2016, Vacchelli was a member of the Fujimorist Force 2011 and was Congressman for the district of Lima elected in the 2011 elections. He stood for re-election in the 2016 election, but lost his seat. During his time in Congress, he presented various bills in favour of sports and people with disabilities, of which 49 were approved.

Personal life 
Vacchelli had osteogenesis imperfecta and used a wheelchair for mobility. He married Evelyn Osorio in May 2015. He had a little brother named "Upa". He died on 12 August 2020 at the age of 38.

References

External links
Congress profile 

Fujimorista politicians
Members of the Congress of the Republic of Peru
Peruvian people of Italian descent
Place of birth missing
Place of death missing
People with osteogenesis imperfecta
1981 births
2020 deaths